Brianhuntleya is a genus of flowering plants belonging to the family Aizoaceae.

Its native range is South African Republic.

Species:

Brianhuntleya intrusa 
Brianhuntleya purpureostyla 
Brianhuntleya quarcicola

References

Aizoaceae
Aizoaceae genera